Union Park may refer to
Union Park (Baltimore), a former baseball ground in Baltimore, Maryland
Union Park, Florida, a census-designated place in Orange County, Florida
Union Park (Chicago), a municipal park in Chicago, Illinois
Union Park, Mauritius,  a village in the Grand Port District
Union Park, Saint Paul, a neighborhood in Saint Paul, Minnesota
Recreation Park (Pittsburgh), formerly known as Union Park, a stadium in Allegheny City, Pennsylvania
Dartmouth Grounds, also known as Union Park, a 19th-century baseball ground in Boston, Massachusetts
Symphony Park, originally known as Union Park, a mixed-use urban community in Las Vegas, Nevada